Pier Luigi Nimis is Professor of Botany at the University of Trieste in Italy. He specialises in lichenology and phytogeography, including the uses of lichens as indicators of pollution and devising methods for web-based identification keys.

Early life and education
He studied for his doctorate at the University of Trieste and it was awarded in 1977.

Career
After his doctorate, Nimis became a member of staff at the University of Trieste and by 1986 he was Professor of Systematic Botany. He has since also held several administrative posts such as the chair of the School of Biological Sciences from 1988 to 1990 and Dean of the Doctoral School of Biomonitoring from 2009 until 2011.

Nimis's research was initially on phytogeography and methods for the joint mapping of plant distribution ranges with multivariate methods, mainly in the Boreal  and Arctic zones. Later he began to concentrate on lichens, including their identification and role as indicators of atmospheric pollution. After the nuclear accident at Chernobyl in 1986 he led programmes to map and monitor levels of radioactive caesium in macrofungi, forest plants and mosses in Italy. He extended his research to the use of lichens as bioindicators of air pollution, demonstrating a correlation between lung cancer and air pollution by mapping human mortality and lichen biodiversity in the Veneto region of Italy. Nimis was also the co-leader of a NATO Advanced Research Workshop in Wales in 2000 that brought together an international group of researchers working on lichens and air pollution and led to the publication of Monitoring with Lichens – Monitoring Lichens in 2002.

His publication in 1993 of a comprehensive catalogue of 2145 infrageneric taxa of lichens found in Italy, followed by an updated version in 2016, are considered significant landmarks in scholarship and thoroughness, and are of value for their descriptions and feature keys of lichens beyond the Italian region.

Nimis's research has also included collaborations on checklists of the lichen biodiversity in the Mediterranean and Antarctic regions, as well as development since the 1990s of web-based identification keys that have been applied to several groups of organisms and developed into the KeyToNature mobile apps from 2015.

Honours and awards
From 1987 until 1993 he was President of the Italian Lichen Society, as well as one of its founders, and President  of  the  International  Association  of  Lichenology  from 2000 until 2004. In 1993 he was awarded the OPTIMA Silver Medal for the best book on the phytotaxonomy of the Mediterranean area published in the preceding three years, the International Ferrari-Soave Prize for Biology from the Academy of Sciences of Turin in 2009, and the Acharius Medal in 2014.

Eponymy
Two genera and three species have been named to honour Nimis: Nimisia , Nimisiostella , Rinodina nimisii , Topelia nimisiana , and Sphaerellothecium nimisii .

Publications
Nimis is the author or co-author of several books and over 250 scientific publications. The books include:

 Pier Luigi Nimis (2016) The Lichens of Italy: A Second Annotated Catalogue Edizioni Università di Trieste, 740 pp  
 Pier Luigi Nimis, Christoph Scheidegger, Patricia A. Wolseley (editors) (2002)  Monitoring with Lichens - Monitoring Lichens NATO Science Series: IV: (NAIV, volume 7) Springer Dordrecht/Kluwer Academic Publishers. 408 pp 
 Pier Luigi Nimis (1993) The Lichens of Italy: An Annotated Catalogue Museo Regionale di Scienze Naturali Torino, Monograph 12. 897 pp 

His scientific publications include:

 Cislaghi, C and Nimis, PL (1997) Lichens, air pollution and lung cancer. Nature 387 463-464.

References

Living people
Lichenologists
Plant ecologists
Acharius Medal recipients
University of Trieste alumni
Academic staff of the University of Trieste
1953 births